Ab Bordeh may refer to:
 Ab Bordeh, Anbarabad
 Ab Bordeh, Jiroft